Skotjernhaugen is a mountain located in Akershus, southeastern Norway.

Mountains of Viken